Crossotus barbatus is a species of beetle in the family Cerambycidae. It was described by Carl Eduard Adolph Gerstaecker in 1871.

References

barbatus
Beetles described in 1871